Pennabilli is a comune (municipality) in the Province of Rimini in the Italian region Emilia-Romagna, located about  southeast of Bologna and about  south of Rimini. In 2019, the podcast This is Love spoke with Anna Bonavita about her love for Pennabilli in their episode, "Anna and Massimo."

History
Until 15 August 2009, the comune belonged to the Marche (Province of Pesaro-Urbino) from which it was detached, together with six other municipalities of the Alta Valmarecchia area, following the implementation of the outcome of a referendum held on 17 and 18 December 2006.

References

External links
 
 Official website
 Pennabilli
 Pennabilli Official website Pro Loco Pennabilli
 Information on Pennabilli

Cities and towns in Emilia-Romagna